Miraj Assembly constituency is one of the 288 Vidhan Sabha (legislative assembly) constituencies of Maharashtra state in western India

Members of Legislative Assembly

Overview
Miraj constituency is one of the eight Vidhan Sabha constituencies located in the Sangli district. Miraj Assembly constituency is part of the Sangli Lok Sabha constituency along with five other Vidhan Sabha segments in this district, namely Khanapur, Sangli, Palus-Kadegaon, Tasgao-Kavathemahakal and Jat.

See also
 Miraj
 List of constituencies of Maharashtra Vidhan Sabha

References

Assembly constituencies of Maharashtra